This list of tunnels in Chile includes any road, rail or waterway tunnel in Chile.

Angostura Tunnel
Caracoles Tunnel
Chacabuco Tunnel
Curvo Tunnel
Cristo Redentor Tunnel
El Farellón Tunnel
El Melón Tunnel
Jardín Botanico O. Tunnel
Jardín Botanico P. Tunnel
La Calavera Tunnel
La Grupa Tunnel
Las Astas Tunnel
Las Palmas Tunnel
Las Raíces Tunnel
Lo Prado Tunnel
Pedro Galleguillos Tunnel
Puclaro Tunnel
Recto Tunnel
Zapata Tunnel

See also
List of tunnels by location

Chile
Tunnels
 
Tunnels